Dungtoe Gewog (Dzongkha: གདུང་སྟོད་) is a gewog (village block) of Samtse District, Bhutan. Dungtoe Gewog is part of Dorokha Dungkhag (sub-district), together with Dorokha and Denchukha Gewogs.

References 

Gewogs of Bhutan
Samtse District